Rhodanobacter glycinis is a Gram-negative, non-spore-forming and motile bacterium from the genus of Rhodanobacter which has been isolated from the rhizoplane of a field with soybeans.

References

Xanthomonadales
Bacteria described in 2014